Bad Papa is a South Korean television series starring Jang Hyuk, Son Yeo-eun and Shin Eun-soo. It is about the struggles of a father who chooses to become a bad person in order to be a good dad. It aired on MBC's Mondays and Tuesdays at 22:00 (KST) time slot from October 1 to November 27, 2018.

Synopsis
Ji-cheol is an incompetent husband and dad. He was a detective who got suspended for allegedly taking a bribe. He can’t come up with their living expenses, let alone the rent. On top of that, his daughter gets into trouble and he has to come up with the settlement money. Cornered, Ji-cheol makes a dangerous decision. Having been a boxing champion in the past, he decides to participate in an illegal boxing match and take the prize money.

Cast

Main 
Jang Hyuk as Yoo Ji-cheol, Fallen father and fighter (43 years old)
Ji-cheol used to be an undefeated boxing champion in his 20s. He fell in love with Sun-joo at first sight, proposed to her in 3 days, and together they had a beautiful daughter named Young-sun. He was a national hero, beloved husband and respected father. However, during the 13th defense match against Min-woo, which was called the game of the century, he lost helplessly, which seemed weird, and the whole world criticized him. He lost money, reputation and the happiness of his family all at once. 11 years later, he suddenly gets an opportunity to make a comeback.
Son Yeo-eun as Choi Sun-joo, Ji-cheol's wife, an erotic novelist and massage chair salesperson (37 years old) 
 She met Ji-cheol, a top sports star, when she just graduated high school. Ji-cheol proposes to her, leaving Min-woo, who has had a crush on her for 3 years without even the chance. She marries Ji-cheol and has a daughter named Young-sun. Life with a national hero is luxurious. However, 11 years later, her national hero husband has been long gone and she is only left with a hopeless man by her side.
Shin Eun-soo as Yoo Young-sun, Y-NYANG dance Youtuber (17 years old)
 Young-sun had a happy life as a rising ballerina. However, the year Young-sun turned 6, her dad’s reputation plummeted for match fixing and everything changed. 17-year-old Young-sun doesn't study, dance and isn’t enthusiastic about anything. However, there is one thing she is secretly passionate about. She uploads videos on Youtube that are very popular. Although she quit ballet, she couldn’t do anything about her love for dancing. She posts videos under the identity “Cat Mask”.
Ha Jun as Lee Min-woo, MMA champion, sports superstar (37 years old)
He is currently number one in MMA middleweight rankings and very popular for his fighting skills. He is enjoying the golden age of his life. However, his family was poor as he was growing up, he was weak and had many scars. Sun-joo is the girl next door that was always by his side and helped him dream of becoming a boxer. He had a crush on her, but didn’t even dream of telling her and ended up letting her marry Ji-cheol, the top sport superstar during that time.
Kim Jae-kyung as Cha Ji-woo, Daughter of Dr. Cha, Ji-cheol’s former partner, a regional investigation unit detective (32 years old)
She joined the team much later than Ji-cheol, but became the youngest female lieutenant and Ji-cheol’s superior through several special promotions. Although everyone else looks down on Ji-cheol, Ji-woo likes him and is on his side. Not even she understands why, but she favors Ji-cheol. After Ji-cheol quits his job as a cop in shame, Ji-woo stumbles upon a mysterious case.

Supporting

Regional Investigation Unit
 Kim Byung-choon as Park Min-sik (47 years old)
Inspector of police investigation unit.
 Kim Wook as Lee Hyun-soo (35 years old)
 Detective, colleague of Ji-woo.

Mixed Martial Arts
Jung Man-sik as Joo Kook-sung (50 years old)
Mixed martial arts promoter who scouted Ji-cheol
Lee David as Kim Yong-dae (26 years old)
3rd class martial arts coach, Ji-cheol's fan. 
 Lee Jun-hyeok as Kim Pil-doo (39 years old)
Chief of illegal gambling fighting ring
Jung Ik-han as Kim Jong-doo (32 years old)
Pil-doo's brother
 Jang Eui-soo as Sang Chul 
An underground martial arts fighter.

Shingu Pharmaceutical
Jung In-gi as Cha Seung-ho
Research professor, Ji-woo's father (60 years old)
Park Ji-bin as Jung Chan-joong  
CEO of Shingu Pharmaceutical (27 years old)
Shin Woo-geum as Kim Dae-sung 
Researcher and PhD assistant (33 years old)
Lee Kyu-ho as Mr Park
Jung Chan-joong's bodyguard

Young-sun's high school
 Kwon Eun-bin as Kim Sang-ah (17 years old) 
A rich student who considers Young-sun as her rival.
Cho Yi-hyun as Kim Se-jung (17 years old)
 Good friend of Young-sun.
Im Sun-woo as Wang Hye-ji (17 years old)
 Good friend of Young-sun.
 Lee Eun-saem as Lee Seul-ki (17 years old) 
 Good friend of Young-sun.

Others
Yoon Bong-gil as Park Ji-hoon (35 years old)
Min-woo's business partner
Choi Yoon-ra as Choi Sun-young (33 years old)
Sun-joo's sister
Joo Jin-mo as Director Jang (60 years old)
Ji-cheol's former promoter and current owner of small boxing ring
 Jung Sung-ho as boxing match commentator (guest appearance)
Kim Si-eun as Choi Sun-joo	
 Hong In as Yong Woo
Brain-tumour patient who took part in clinical trial
Baek Eun-kyung
Sun-joo's colleague in departmental store
 Kim Seung-hyun as Kim Yoon Soo
Ji-cheol's friend who ran away after cheating him of his money

Original soundtrack

Part 1

Part 2

Part 3

Part 4

Part 5

Part 6

Ratings
 In the table below,  represent the lowest ratings and  represent the highest ratings.
 NR denotes that the drama did not rank in the top 20 daily programs on that date.
 N/A denotes that the rating is not known.

4 Episodes aired back-to-back on October 15 and November 6.
No episodes on October 16, 23, 30 and November 5 due to the broadcast of KBO League baseball games.

Awards and nominations

International Broadcast
 Bad Papa airs in Taiwan on KKTV from 2 October 2018.
 Bad Papa airs in Singapore, Malaysia and Hong Kong on Oh!K TV Asia from 2 October 2018.
 Bad Papa airs in USA on Kocowa TV from 2 October 2018.
 Bad Papa airs in Japan on KNTV from 5 March 2019.

Notes

References

External links
  
 

Korean-language television shows
2018 South Korean television series debuts
2018 South Korean television series endings
MBC TV television dramas
Television series by Signal Entertainment Group